The Whangae River is a river of the Northland Region of New Zealand's North Island. It flows generally northeast to reach a southwestern arm of the Bay of Islands.

See also
List of rivers of New Zealand

References

Far North District
Rivers of the Northland Region
Rivers of New Zealand